Any Other Way To Go? (also titled as Live at Crystal Skates) is a live album released in 1987 by the Washington, D.C.-based go-go band Chuck Brown & the Soul Searchers. The album was recorded live at the Crystal Skate in Temple Hills, Maryland. The album consists go-go renditions of classic jazz and swing songs performed with a go-go beat.

The album is especially known for go-go rendition of Grandmaster Flash and the Furious Five's hip-hop song "The Message", and the go-go songs "Be Bumpin' Fresh" and "Go-Go Drug Free" (which featured a cameo rap from the former Mayor of the District of Columbia Marion Barry).

Track listing

Personnel
 Chuck Brown – lead vocals, electric guitar
 John M. Buchannan – keyboards, trombone
 Leroy Fleming – tenor saxophone, background vocals
 Curtis Johnson – keyboards
 Donald Tillery – trumpet, background vocals
 Ricardo D. Wellman – drums
 Rowland Smith – congas, background vocals
 Glenn Ellis – bass guitar, percussions

References

External links
Any Other Way To Go? at Discogs

1987 live albums
Chuck Brown albums
Live rhythm and blues albums
Live jazz-funk albums